Real America's Voice is a right-wing to far-right streaming, cable and satellite television channel founded in 2020 and owned by Robert J. Sigg. The network and its affiliated website provides alternative views to mainstream media,through the contribution of investigative reporters and subject matter experts.  The network is a sister channel to WeatherNation TV.

Personalities
Some of the network's top personalities include Grant Stinchfield, Steve Bannon, Charlie Kirk, Ted Nugent, Gina Loudon, John Solomon, and Ed Henry.

Previous network personalities included former Missouri governor Eric Greitens and 2022 Michigan Republican gubernatorial nominee Tudor Dixon.

References

External links 

2020 establishments in Colorado
Conservative media in the United States
Conspiracist media
English-language television stations in the United States
Far-right organizations in the United States
Television channels and stations established in 2020